The following is a list of notable deaths in March 2016.

Entries for each day are listed alphabetically by surname. A typical entry lists information in the following sequence:
Name, age, country of citizenship and reason for notability, established cause of death, reference.

March 2016

1
Coca Crystal, 68, American television personality and political activist, respiratory failure.
Adam Dziewonski, 79, Polish-born American geophysicist. 
Ítalo Estupiñán, 64, Ecuadorian footballer (Toluca), cardiac arrest.
Ilir Hoti, 58, Albanian economist and banker, melanoma.
Gary Hutzel, 60, American visual effects supervisor (Star Trek, Battlestar Galactica, Defiance), heart attack.
Nestori Kaasalainen, 101, Finnish politician.
Reijo Kanerva, 72, Finnish footballer.
Jim Kimsey, 76, American technology executive, co-founder and CEO of AOL, melanoma.
Martin Legassick, 75, South African historian and activist, cancer.
Peter Mathias, 88, British economic historian.
Gayle McCormick, 67, American singer (Smith), cancer.
Jean Miotte, 90, French abstract painter.
Stack Pierce, 82, American actor.
Louise Plowright, 59, British actress (Mamma Mia!, EastEnders, Families), pancreatic cancer.
Lee Reherman, 49, American actor (American Gladiators, Star Trek Into Darkness, Last Action Hero).
Frank Terpil, 76, American CIA agent and arms dealer. 
Georgios Tsakanikas, 81, Greek Olympic shot putter (1956, 1960, 1964).
Tony Warren, 79, English television screenwriter and producer (Coronation Street).
Martha Wright, 92, American actress (South Pacific, The Sound of Music, Goodyear Television Playhouse) and singer.

2
Janusz Bolonek, 77, Polish Roman Catholic prelate and diplomat, Apostolic nuncio (1989–2013).
Chandra Ranaraja, 77, Sri Lankan politician.
Robert Del Tufo, 82, American attorney, New Jersey Attorney General (1990–1993), lung cancer.
Noémia Delgado, 82, Portuguese television and film director.
Tony Dyson, 68, British film prop designer (R2-D2).
James Anthony Gaffney, 87, British civil engineer.
Roger Hickman, 61, Australian yachtsman, winner of the Sydney to Hobart Yacht Race (Handicap, 2014), brain cancer.
Rosemary Hinkfuss, 84, American politician, member of the Wisconsin State Assembly (1988–1994).
Prince Johann Georg of Hohenzollern, 83, German royal and art historian.
Dick Hudson, 75, American football player (Buffalo Bills).
Marion Patrick Jones, 85, Trinidadian writer.
Arthur Keily, 94, British Olympic marathon runner (1960).
Benoît Lacroix, 100, Canadian Dominican priest and historian.
Ghais Malik, 85, Egyptian Anglican prelate, Bishop of Egypt (1984–2000).
Aubrey McClendon, 56, American energy and basketball executive, CEO of Chesapeake Energy, part-owner of the Oklahoma City Thunder, traffic collision.
James Barrett McNulty, 71, American politician, Mayor of Scranton, Pennsylvania (1982–1986), cancer and cardiac disorder.
Allan Michaelsen, 68, Danish football player and coach, brain cancer.
Sergio Ricossa, 88, Italian economist.
Reid Scott, 89, Canadian politician and judge.
Kalidas Shrestha, 93, Nepali artist and academic, pneumonia as a complication from a kidney infection.
Don Walsh, 81, Australian football player (Collingwood).
Paul Webley, 62, British educator, president of SOAS, University of London (2006–2015), cancer.
Władysław Wojtakajtis, 67, Polish Olympic swimmer.
R. Tom Zuidema, 88, American anthropologist.

3
Ralph Baruch, 92, German-born American media mogul (Viacom).
Per Beskow, 89, Swedish biblical scholar.
Lord James Blears, 92, British professional wrestler.
Rooney L. Bowen, 82, American politician.
Jack Buckalew, 83, American politician, member of the West Virginia Senate (1995–1998).
Berta Cáceres, 42, Honduran indigenous leader, shot.
Anthony Carrigan, 35, British academic, cancer.
Gavin Christopher, 66, American R&B/hip-hop musician, songwriter and producer, heart failure.
Martin Crowe, 53, New Zealand cricketer (national team), lymphoma.
Marcello De Cecco, 76, Italian economist.
Sir Andrew Derbyshire, 92, British architect.
Sophie Dessus, 60, French politician, member of the National Assembly for Corrèze's 1st Constituency (since 2012), cancer.
Ashok Ghosh, 94, Indian politician, General Secretary of All India Forward Bloc (since 1946), lower respiratory tract infection.
Yves Guéna, 93, French politician, President of the Constitutional Council (2000–2004), High Commissioner of Ivory Coast (1960).
Hayabusa, 47, Japanese professional wrestler (Frontier Martial-Arts Wrestling), brain hemorrhage.
Henry R. Horsey, 91, American judge, member of the Delaware Supreme Court (1978–1994).
Thanat Khoman, 101, Thai politician, Foreign Minister (1959–1971).
Laura Knaperek, 60, American politician, member of the Arizona House of Representatives (1995–2006), ovarian cancer.
Natalya Krachkovskaya, 77, Russian actress (Ivan Vasilievich: Back to the Future), heart attack.
Ted McCaskill, 79, Canadian ice hockey player (Los Angeles Sharks).
William O'Brien, 71, American police officer, Chief of Police for Miami (1998–2000), resigned after Elián González custody battle raid, throat cancer.
Tome Serafimovski, 80, Macedonian sculptor. 
Sarah Tait, 33, Australian rower, world champion (2005), Olympic silver medallist (2012), cervical cancer.
Jim Thistle, 61, Canadian lawyer, negotiated Atlantic Accord (1985), amyotrophic lateral sclerosis.
Retta Ward, 62, American health official and teacher, Secretary of the New Mexico Department of Health (since 2013).
Mike Widger, 67, American CFL football player (Montreal Alouettes, Ottawa Rough Riders), Grey Cup Champion (1970, 1974).

4
Taha Jabir Alalwani, 81, Iraqi-born American Islamic theologian.
Bankroll Fresh, 28, American rapper, shot.
John Brooks, Baron Brooks of Tremorfa, 88, Welsh politician and boxing executive, president of the British Boxing Board of Control and Welsh Sports Hall of Fame.
Jerry Dolyn Brown, 73, American pottery artist.
Theodor Cazaban, 95, French writer.
Daryl Cohen, 80, Australian Olympic weightlifter.
Bud Collins, 86, American sports journalist.
Pat Conroy, 70, American author (The Prince of Tides, The Great Santini, The Lords of Discipline), pancreatic cancer.
Pirro Cuniberti, 92, Italian artist.
Joey Feek, 40, American country singer (Joey + Rory), cervical cancer.
Vincenzo Franco, 98, Italian Roman Catholic prelate, Bishop of Tursi-Lagonegro (1974–1981) and Archbishop of Otranto (1981–1993).
David M. Gates, 94, American ecologist.
Ge Cunzhuang, 87, Chinese actor, heart failure.
Adriana Innocenti, 89, Italian actress (Eye of the Cat, Lobster for Breakfast, The Cat).
Ekrem Jevrić, 54, Montenegrin singer, heart attack.
Thea Knutzen, 85, Norwegian politician, MP (1985–1993).
Yuri Kuznetsov, 83, Azerbaijani Soviet football player and coach (Neftchi).
Peter Laufer, 79, German Olympic athlete.
Enriquito López, 60, Dominican Republic politician, member of the Senate (2000–2004).
Domenico Maselli, 82, Italian politician.
Bill Michael, 81, American football coach (UTEP, 1977–1981).
Thomas G. Morris, 96, American politician, member of the U.S. House of Representatives for New Mexico's at-large district (1959–1969) and New Mexico House (1953–1958).
Julio Lacarte Muró, 97, Uruguayan diplomat and politician.
Morgan F. Murphy, 83, American politician, member of the U.S. House of Representatives from Illinois's 3rd congressional district (1971–1981), prostate cancer.
George Ndung’u Mwicigi, 83, Kenyan politician.
P. K. Nair, 82, Indian film archivist.
Ramón Palomares, 80, Venezuelan poet.
William H. Plackett, 78, American naval non-commissioned officer, 6th MCPON (1985–1988).
Jane Plant, 71, British geochemist.
Joseph Rwegasira, 81, Tanzanian diplomat, Minister of Foreign Affairs (1993–1995), Ambassador to Zambia.
P. A. Sangma, 68, Indian politician, Speaker of the Lok Sabha (1996–1998), Chief Minister of Meghalaya (1988–1990), heart attack.
Marilyn Stokstad, 87, American art historian.
Harry Turbott, 85, New Zealand architect and landscape architect.
Abbas Vaez-Tabasi, 80, Iranian cleric, Grand Imam of Ali al-Ridha mosque (since 1979), cancer. 
Vladimir Yumin, 64, Russian Soviet wrestler, Olympic champion (1976), heart attack.
Zhou Xiaoyan, 98, Chinese vocal pedagogue and classical soprano.

5
David Abbott, 81, British-born New Zealand cricket umpire, cancer.
Hassan Al-Turabi, 84, Sudanese Islamic spiritual leader, member of the National Assembly.
Giorgio Ariani, 74, Italian comedian and actor (Pinocchio).
Antoni Asunción, 64, Spanish politician, Minister of Interior (1993–1994).
Caesar Belser, 71, American football player (Kansas City Chiefs), Super Bowl winner (1970), lung cancer.
Julio César Chalar, Uruguayan lawyer and judge. 
Paul Couch, 51, Australian footballer (Geelong), heart attack.
James Douglas, 86, American actor (As the World Turns, Peyton Place, G.I. Blues).
Helle-Vibeke Erichsen, 76, Danish artist.
Sture Eskilsson, 85, Swedish economist. 
John Evans, Baron Evans of Parkside, 85, British politician, MP for Newton (1974–1983) and St Helens North (1983–1997).
Even Hansen, 92, Norwegian footballer (Odd, national team).
Nikolaus Harnoncourt, 86, Austrian conductor and cellist (Vienna Symphony), founder of Concentus Musicus Wien.
Alan Henry, 68, British motorsport journalist.
Henry Hobhouse, 91, British author (Seeds of Change: Five Plants That Transformed Mankind). 
Chip Hooper, 53, American musical agent (Dave Matthews, Phish), cancer.
Jim MacNeill, 87, Canadian environmentalist and senior Cabinet adviser, pneumonia.
Lester Menke, 97, American politician, member of the Iowa House of Representatives (1973–1985).
Harriet Cornelia Mills, 95, American academic and sinologist.
John Douglas, 21st Earl of Morton, 88, British aristocrat.
Ottavio Panunzi, 83, Italian Olympic boxer.
Robert Redbird, 76, American Kiowa artist, Alzheimer's disease.
Rafael Squirru, 90, Argentine author.
Panayiotis Tetsis, 91, Greek painter.
Jaroslav Tomáš, 67, Czech Olympic volleyball player.
Ray Tomlinson, 74, American computer programmer, invented system to send first email and assigned use of @ sign, heart attack.
Stephen H. Webb, 54, American theologian, suicide.
Al Wistert, 95, American football player (Philadelphia Eagles, Michigan Wolverines), NFL Champion (1948, 1949).

6
Barbara Almond, 77, American psychiatrist, bladder cancer.
Wally Bragg, 86, English footballer (Brentford).
Jerry Bridges, 86, American evangelical Christian author, speaker and administrator (The Navigators).
Joan Brown, 90, British potter.
Elizabeth Garrett, 52, American educator, president of Cornell University (since 2015), colon cancer.
Znaur Gassiev, 90, South Ossetian politician.
Paolo Giglio, 89, Maltese Roman Catholic prelate and diplomat, Apostolic nuncio (1986–2002).
D. G. Jones, 87, Canadian poet.
 Arto Koivisto, 85, Finnish basketball player.
Joseph Kumuondala Mbimba, 75, Congolese Roman Catholic prelate, Bishop of Bokungu–Ikela (1982–1991) and Archbishop of Mbandaka-Bikoro (since 1991).
Kalabhavan Mani, 45, Indian actor and singer, liver cirrhosis and methyl alcohol poisoning.
Demetri Marchessini, 81, Greek businessman.
Ernest George Mardon, 87, British-born Canadian historian.
James Ocholi, 55, Nigerian politician, traffic collision.
Francis Pasion, 38, Filipino director (On the Wings of Love), heart attack.
Aldo Ralli, 80, Italian actor (Il Divo, Crime in Formula One).
Nancy Reagan, 94, American First Lady (1981–1989) and actress (Hellcats of the Navy, Donovan's Brain, The Next Voice You Hear...), heart failure.
Gaspar Rosety, 57, Spanish journalist, complications from a stroke.
María Rostworowski, 100, Peruvian historian.
Harold H. Saunders, 85, American diplomat, prostate cancer.
Elwyn L. Simons, 87, American paleontologist.
Gary Smalley, 75, American family counselor, Christian and relationship author, complications from heart and kidney disease.
Elizabeth Strohfus, 96, American military pilot (WASP), recipient of two Congressional Gold Medals, complications from a fall.
Akira Tago, 90, Japanese psychologist.
Sheila Varian, 78, American horse breeder (Arabian horses), ovarian cancer.

7
Raymond Conway Benjamin, 91, Australian Roman Catholic prelate, Bishop of Townsville (1984–2000).
Leonard Berney, 95, British military officer, a liberator of Bergen-Belsen, heart attack.
Gary Braasch, 70, American environmental photographer.
Joe Cabot, 94, American jazz musician and band leader.
Bill Cooper, 87, British sailor.
Scott Goodall, 80, British comic book writer (Fishboy).
Adrian Hardiman, 64, Irish judge, member of the Supreme Court (since 2000).
Bobby Johns, 83, American race car driver (NASCAR, Indianapolis 500).
Börje Karvonen, 77, Finnish Olympic boxer.
Steve Kraly, 86, American baseball player (New York Yankees), World Series Champion (1953).
Béla Kuharszki, 75, Hungarian footballer (Újpesti Dózsa).
Min Enze, 92, Chinese chemist and academician (Chinese Academy of Sciences and Engineering).
Khalid Mahmood Mithu, 55, Bangladeshi film director (Gohine Shobdo), falling tree.
Jean-Bernard Raimond, 90, French politician, Minister of Foreign Affairs (1986–1988), ambassador to Morocco, Poland, the Soviet Union and the Vatican.
Des O'Reilly, 61, Australian rugby league player (Sydney Roosters).
Paul Ryan, 66, American comic artist (Fantastic Four, Superman, The Phantom).
Michael White, 80, Scottish film and theatre producer (Monty Python and the Holy Grail, The Rocky Horror Picture Show), Tony winner (1971), heart failure.
Quentin Young, 93, American physician.

8
Mohamed Allek, 42, Algerian athlete, Paralympic champion (1996, 2000).
Luigi Corioni, 78, Italian bathroom furnishings and football executive (Brescia Calcio, A.C. Milan, Bologna).
Richard Davalos, 85, American actor (Cool Hand Luke, East of Eden, Kelly's Heroes).
Dieter Fänger, 90, German Olympic fencer (1960).
Aldo Ferrer, 88, Argentine economist.
Ross Hannaford, 65, Australian musician (Daddy Cool), cancer.
Jerome Heckenkamp, 36, Australian-born American computer hacker.
Ron Jacobs, 78, American broadcaster, co-creator of American Top 40.
David S. Johnson, 70, American computer scientist. 
John Jones, 90, British Olympic water polo player (1952, 1956).
Esko Karhunen, 88, Finnish Olympic basketball player (1952) and contributor.
Sir George Martin, 90, British Hall of Fame record producer (The Beatles), composer, arranger and engineer, six-time Grammy Award winner.
Claus Ogerman, 86, German jazz conductor and arranger.
M. V. Rao, 88, Indian agricultural scientist.
Alfred E. Senn, 83, American historian and academic, awarded Order of Vytautas the Great for service to Lithuania.
Reino Suojanen, 90, Finnish footballer

9
Bruno Agostinelli, 28, Canadian tennis player (Davis Cup), traffic collision.
*Sergio Arellano Stark, 94, Chilean military officer, leader of the Caravan of Death, Alzheimer's disease.
*Galagama Sri Aththadassi Thera, 94, Sri Lankan Buddhist monk, Mahanayaka of the Asgiriya Chapter of Siyam Nikaya (since 2015).
Lawrence E. Bennett, 92, American politician, member of the New York State Assembly (1983–1994).
Karen Carroll, 58, American blues singer.
Jon English, 66, English-born Australian musician and actor (Against the Wind), complications from surgery.
Léon Francioli, 69, Swiss double bass player.
Ray Griff, 75, Canadian country music singer ("If I Let Her Come In") and songwriter ("Canadian Pacific"), complications of pneumonia from surgery.
John Gutfreund, 86, American investor (Salomon Brothers), complications from pneumonia.
Robert Horton, 91, American actor (Wagon Train).
William Russell Houck, 89, American Roman Catholic prelate, Bishop of Jackson (1984–2003), complications from heart surgery.
Giancarlo Ibarguen, 53, Guatemalan businessman and academic, president of Universidad Francisco Marroquín (2003–2013), amyotrophic lateral sclerosis.
Gary Jeter, 61, American football player (Los Angeles Rams, New York Giants), heart attack.
Ralph S. Larsen, 77, American consumer products executive, CEO and Chairman of Johnson & Johnson, cardiac arrest.
Clyde Lovellette, 86, American basketball player (Minneapolis Lakers, St. Louis Hawks, Boston Celtics), NBA champion (1954, 1963, 1964), Olympic champion (1952), cancer.
James McNamara, 76, Irish long-distance runner, M50 10000 metre world record holder (1989–1991).
John Pennebaker, 72, American politician, member of the Mississippi House of Representatives (1975–1992).
Reinhold Remmert, 85, German mathematician. 
Ivan Rohrt, 95, Australian sports administrator, President of Carlton Football Club (1974–1977).
Tina St. Claire, 31, American artist, cancer.
Ted Szilva, 81, Canadian monument creator (Big Nickel).
Naná Vasconcelos, 71, Brazilian jazz percussionist and vocalist, eight-time Grammy Award winner, lung cancer.
Bill Wade, 85, American football player (Los Angeles Rams, Chicago Bears), NFL Champion (1963).
Coy Wayne Wesbrook, 58, American convicted mass murderer, execution by lethal injection.

10
Sir Ken Adam, 95, German-born British production designer (Dr. Strangelove, James Bond, The Madness of King George), Oscar winner (1975, 1994).
Ernestine Anderson, 87, American jazz vocalist.
Joan Bates, 86, British Sealandic princess.
Anita Brookner, 87, British novelist (Hotel du Lac) and art historian, Man Booker Prize winner (1984).
Daniel Buess, 40, Swiss drummer.
Fangge Dupan, 89, Taiwanese poet.
William Dyke, 85, American politician, mayor of Madison, Wisconsin (1969–1973), complications from pancreatic cancer.
Claude Estier, 90, French politician and journalist, member of the National Assembly for Paris (1967–1968, 1981–1986), MEP for France (1979–1981).
Bill Gadsby, 88, Canadian Hall of Fame ice hockey player (Detroit Red Wings, Chicago Blackhawks, New York Rangers).
Andrew Gotianun, 88, Filipino real estate and financial sector executive, founder of Filinvest.
Gogi Grant, 91, American pop singer ("The Wayward Wind").
Andreas Henrisusanta, 80, Indonesian Roman Catholic prelate, Bishop of Tanjungkarang (1976–2012).
Mohammad Irfan, 64, Indian politician, Uttar Pradesh MLA for Bilari (since 2012), traffic collision.
Hans Kleefeld, 86, Canadian graphic designer (Air Canada, TD Bank).
Kostas Koutsomytis, 77, Greek film director and screenwriter.
Roberts Bishop Owen, 90, American lawyer and diplomat.
Roberto Perfumo, 73, Argentine footballer (Racing Club, Cruzeiro, national team), fall. 
Judy Pickard, 94, New Zealand abstract painter, librarian and advocate for women's rights.
Jovito Salonga, 95, Filipino politician, Senate President (1987–1992), cardiac arrest.
Julio Vial, 82, Chilean footballer.

11
Tita Kovač Artemis, 85, Slovene-born Greek chemist and writer. 
Joe Ascione, 54, American jazz drummer.
Ben Bagdikian, 96, Armenian-American educator and journalist.
Iolanda Balaș, 79, Romanian high jumper, Olympic champion (1960, 1964), director of the FRA (1988–2005), complications from a gastric disorder.
Sel Belsham, 85, New Zealand rugby league player (Auckland, national team) and cricketer (Auckland). 
François-Eudes Chanfrault, 41, French composer (The Hills Have Eyes, High Tension).
Antonio Cabangon-Chua, 81, Filipino real estate, financial executive and diplomat, Ambassador to Laos, founder of Citystate Savings Bank.
Deva Dassy, 104, French opera singer.
Geoffrey Eglinton, 88, British chemist.
Shawn Elliott, 79, American singer and actor (The Dead Pool, Broken City, Law & Order).
Keith Emerson, 71, English progressive rock keyboardist (The Nice; Emerson, Lake & Palmer), suicide by gunshot.
Rómulo Macció, 84, Argentine painter.
Doreen Massey, 72, British geographer. 
Nicole Maurey, 89, French actress.
Louis Meyers, 60, American festival organizer, co-founder of South by Southwest, director of Folk Alliance International, suspected heart attack.
Brenda Naylor, 89, British sculptor. 
Dragan Nikolić, 72, Serbian actor.
Vasco Nunes, 41, Portuguese cinematographer and cameraman (Planet B-Boy, Anvil! The Story of Anvil, Rampart).
Gerard Reedy, 76, American Jesuit priest and academic, president of the College of the Holy Cross (1994–1998).
Billy Ritchie, 79, Scottish footballer (Rangers, Partick Thistle).
Ruth Terry, 95, American singer and actress (Pistol Packin' Mama).
Lawrence Van Gelder, 83, American newspaper journalist (The New York Times), leiomyosarcoma.

12
Mo Abbaro, 82, Sudanese-born British potter. 
Christopher Armishaw, 63, English cricketer (Derbyshire).
Rafiq Azad, 74, Bangladeshi poet, stroke.
Annastasia Batikis, 88, American baseball player (Racine Belles).
Tommy Brown, 84, American R&B singer.
John Caldwell, 87, Australian demographer.
Donnie Duncan, 75, American football coach (Iowa State), cancer.
Erik Duval, 50, Belgian computer scientist, T-cell lymfoblastic lymphoma.
Richard Fowler, 67–68, American naturalist and wilderness guide. 
Eliot Gant, 89, American executive (Gant).
Verena Huber-Dyson, 92, American mathematician. 
Morton Hunt, 96, American psychologist and science writer.
Felix Ibru, 80, Nigerian politician, Governor of Delta State (1992–1993).
Harry Kartz, 102, British businessman, Aston Villa chairman (1978–1980).
Mohammed Khalfan Bin Kharbash, 60, Emirati politician, Minister of State for Finance and Industry Affairs (1997–2007).
Pierce Lively, 94, American federal judge, U.S. Court of Appeals for the Sixth Circuit (1972–1989).
Carlos Ozores, 76, Panamanian politician, Vice President (1984; 1989).
Rudolf Sarközi, 71, Austrian Romani activist.
Lloyd Shapley, 92, American mathematician and economist, laureate of the Nobel Memorial Prize in Economic Sciences (2012).
Helmut Veith, 45, Austrian computer scientist.
Bill Whitby, 72, American baseball player (Minnesota Twins).

13
Trent Baker, 25, Australian baseball player (Brisbane Bandits).
Ken Broderick, 74, Canadian ice hockey player (Edmonton Oilers, Boston Bruins), Olympic bronze medallist (1968).
Adrienne Corri, 85, British actress (Doctor Zhivago, A Clockwork Orange, Doctor Who), heart failure.
Masanobu Deme, 83, Japanese film director (Station to Heaven, Baruto no Gakuen).
Darryl Hunt, 50, American justice reform activist, apparent suicide by gunshot.
Lord Michael Jones, 68, Scottish judge.
Sidney Mear, 97, American trumpeter.
Bo Nat Khann Mway, 55, Burmese Karen military officer, commander-in-chief of DKBA, neck cancer.
Keith Ollerenshaw, 87, Australian Olympic long-distance runner (1956).
Beatriz Canedo Patiño, 66, Bolivian fashion designer.
Henry Porter, 94, Canadian vice-admiral, Commander Maritime Command (1970–1971). 
Sai Prashanth, 30, Indian actor, suspected suicide by poison.
Hilary Putnam, 89, American philosopher, mathematician and computer scientist.
Jon Roehlk, 54, American arena football player.
Martin Olav Sabo, 78, American politician, member of the U.S. House of Representatives for Minnesota's 5th district (1979–2007).
József Verebes, 74, Hungarian football player and coach.

14
Mónica Arriola Gordillo, 44, Mexican politician, member of the Chamber of Deputies (2006–2009), brain tumor.
Nicolau Breyner, 75, Portuguese playwright, director and actor.
John W. Cahn, 88, German-born American metallurgist, awarded National Medal of Science (1998), namesake of Cahn–Hilliard equation, leukemia. 
Patrick Cain, 53, American football player (Detroit Lions), lung cancer.
Sir Peter Maxwell Davies, 81, English composer and conductor, Master of the Queen's Music (2004–2014), leukaemia.
Lilly Dubowitz, 85, Hungarian-born British paediatrician. 
Virgilio Elizondo, 80, American Roman Catholic priest and theologian, suicide by gunshot.
Surangani Ellawala, 76, Sri Lankan politician, Governor of the Central Province (2015–2016).
Riccardo Garrone, 89, Italian actor (La Dolce Vita, The Yellow Rolls-Royce, Swordsman of Siena).
Tamara Grigsby, 41, American politician, member of the Wisconsin State Assembly (2004–2012).
Geoffrey Hartman, 86, German-born American literary critic.
Lloyd R. Leavitt, Jr., 87, American air force lieutenant general.
Peter Lerche, 88, German jurist.
Ahmed Baba Miské, 80, Mauritanian politician and diplomat, Ambassador to the United States (1964–1966), Permanent Representative to the United Nations (1964–1966).
Leilani Muir, 71, Canadian human rights activist.
Hans-Martin Pawlowski, 84, German lawyer and academic. 
June Peppas, 86, American AAGPBL baseball player (Kalamazoo Lassies).
Suranimala Rajapaksha, 67, Sri Lankan politician and minister, MP (1994–2004).
Vic Schwenk, 91, American football player and coach.
Davy Walsh, 92, Irish footballer.
Arkangelo Bari Wanji, 80, South Sudanese politician and academic, member of the National Assembly (since 2010).

15
Jacqueline Alduy, 91, French politician.
Sylvia Anderson, 88, British television producer and voice actress (Thunderbirds). 
André Bénard, 93, French oil and transit executive, co-chairman of the Eurotunnel.
Better Loosen Up, 30, Australian Thoroughbred racehorse, winner of the Japan Cup and Racehorse of the Year (1990), euthanised.
Asa Briggs, Baron Briggs, 94, British historian, codebreaker and life peer.
Richard Burke, 83, Irish politician, member of the Dáil Éireann for Dublin County South and Dublin West, European Commissioner (1977–1980, 1982–1984).
Robert Carrickford, 88, Irish actor (The Irish R.M., Glenroe).
Daryl Coley, 60, American gospel singer.
Jean Defraigne, 86, Dutch-born Belgian politician, member of the Chamber of Representatives (1965–1974, 1977–1989) and Senate (1974–1977).
Ryo Fukui, 67, Japanese jazz pianist.
Ralph C. Johnson, 62, American politician, member of the North Carolina House of Representatives (since 2015), complications from a stroke.
Paul Lange, 85, German sprint canoeist, Olympic champion (1960).
Prince Mfanasibili of Swaziland, 77, Swazi royal.
Lincoln Myers, 66, Trinidadian politician, Environment and National Service minister and MP for St Ann's East.
John Ene Okon, 47, Nigerian football player and coach (national team).
Earline W. Parmon, 72, American politician, member of the North Carolina House of Representatives (2002–2012) and Senate (2012–2015).
Alice Pollitt, 86, American AAGPBL baseball player (Rockford Peaches).
Jan Pronk, 97, Dutch cyclist, world champion in motor-paced racing (1951).
Seru Rabeni, 37, Fijian rugby union player (national team, Leicester Tigers), suspected heart attack.
Sebastian Rahtz, 61, British digital humanities researcher, brain cancer.
Lyubka Rondova, 79, Bulgarian folk singer.
Thanh Tùng, 67, Vietnamese songwriter.
Vladimir Yurin, 68, Russian football coach and player (FC Torpedo Moscow).

16
Wilson Ndolo Ayah, 84, Kenyan diplomat and politician, Foreign Minister (1990–1993), MP for Kisumu (1992–1997).
William B. Bader, 84, American civil servant, Assistant Secretary of State for Educational and Cultural Affairs (1999–2001).
Vladimiras Beriozovas, 86, Lithuanian politician, member of the Supreme Soviet of the Lithuanian SSR (1985–1990), Seimas for Kėdainiai (1990–1992).
Oleg Eremeev, 93, Soviet Russian painter.
Alexander Esenin-Volpin, 91, Soviet-born American poet and mathematician.
Ali Ahmed Hussain Khan, 76, Indian shehnai musician, kidney disease.
Garry Lefebvre, 71, Canadian CFL football player (Edmonton Eskimos).
George McLean, 92, Canadian journalist and news anchor (The National).
George Menzies, 85, New Zealand rugby league player and coach (West Coast, national team).
Gene Short, 62, American basketball player (Seattle SuperSonics, New York Knicks), bronze medalist at the 1974 FIBA World Championship.
Frank Sinatra Jr., 72, American singer (That Face!) and actor (Hollywood Homicide), heart attack.
Brian Smyth, 91, Irish Gaelic footballer and hurler (Meath). 
Alan Spavin, 74, English footballer (Preston North End, Dundalk).
Georges Tarabichi, 77, Syrian writer and translator.

17
Ralph David Abernathy III, 56, American politician, member of the Georgia House of Representatives (1988–1992) and State Senate (1992–1998), liver cancer.
Bandar bin Saud bin Abdulaziz Al Saud, 90, Saudi royal.
Shozo Awazu, 92, Japanese judoka.
André Boerstra, 91, Dutch field hockey player, Olympic silver medalist (1952), bronze medalist (1948).
E.L. Boteler, 96, American politician, member of the Mississippi House of Representatives (1956–1972).
Claudine K. Brown, 67, American museum director (Smithsonian Institution).
Burdett Coutts, 96, Singaporean Olympic hockey player.
Meir Dagan, 71, Israeli military officer and intelligence official, Director of Mossad (2002–2011), cancer.
Paul Daniels, 77, British magician (The Paul Daniels Magic Show), brain tumour.
Larry Drake, 66, American actor (L.A. Law, Johnny Bravo, Darkman), Emmy winner (1988, 1989), blood cancer.
Gaúcho, 52, Brazilian football coach and player (Flamengo), prostate cancer.
Léonie Geisendorf, 101, Polish-born Swedish architect.
Charles Kaufman, 87, American educator (Mannes College of Music), acute myeloid leukemia.
Trần Lập, 42, Vietnamese rock singer, colorectal cancer.
Zoltán Kamondi, 55, Hungarian film director (Paths of Death and Angels).
Marian Kociniak, 80, Polish actor (How I Unleashed World War II).
Subrata Maitra, 59, Indian cardiologist, brain cancer.
Solomon Marcus, 91, Romanian mathematician.
Sandy McDonald, 78, Scottish Christian minister, Moderator of the General Assembly of the Church of Scotland (1997–1998), pulmonary fibrosis.
David McSkimming, 66, Australian pianist, opera repetiteur and vocal coach, motor neurone disease.
Cliff Michelmore, 96, British television presenter and producer.
Frederick Moore, 85, English cricketer (Lancashire).
Trevor J. Phillips, 89, British-born American philosopher.
Alexander Prokhorenko, 25, Russian soldier, airstrike.
Jean Prodromidès, 88, French composer.
Eliezer Ronen, 84, Mexican-born Israeli politician, member of the Knesset (1974–1977). 
Ilkka Ruohonen, 57, Finnish cultural anthropologist and documentary film maker.
Jun Shiraoka, 71, Japanese photographer.
Pat Sobeski, 64, Canadian politician, MP for Cambridge (1988–1993).
Angela Stevens, 90, American actress (He Cooked His Goose, Creature with the Atom Brain).
Steve Young, 73, American outlaw country music singer–songwriter ("Seven Bridges Road").

18
Miguel Hernández Agosto, 88, Puerto Rican politician, President of the Senate (1981–1992).
José Carlos Avellar, 79, Brazilian film critic (Jornal do Brasil).
Melody Millicent Danquah, 79, Ghanaian air force pilot.
Charlie Davis, 89, American baseball player (Memphis Red Sox).
David Egan, 61, American musician, lung cancer.
Adnan Abu Hassan, 57, Malaysian composer, stroke, diabetes and kidney failure.
Barry Hines, 76, English author (A Kestrel for a Knave), Alzheimer's disease.
Șerban Iliescu, 60, Romanian linguist and journalist.
Kong Jaw-sheng, 60, Taiwanese bank executive, chairman of the FSC (2004–2006), heart attack.
Cherylene Lee, 60, American actress (Donovan's Reef), breast cancer.
Ned Miller, 90, American country singer-songwriter.
Jan Němec, 79, Czech film director (A Report on the Party and the Guests) and screenwriter.
Murray Newman, 92, American-born Canadian curator and zoologist, founding director of the Vancouver Aquarium (1955–1993), stroke.
Fred Richards, 88, American baseball player (Chicago Cubs).
Allan Rocher, 80, Australian politician, Senator (1977–1981) and MP (1981–1998), Consul-General in Los Angeles.
Joe Santos, 84, American actor (The Rockford Files, The Sopranos, The Last Boy Scout), heart attack.
Lothar Späth, 78, German politician, Minister President of Baden-Württemberg (1978–1991), Alzheimer's disease.
Les Tanyuk, 77, Ukrainian theatre and film director and politician, MP (1990–2007).
John Urry, 69, British sociologist.
Tray Walker, 23, American football player (Baltimore Ravens), dirt bike collision.
Guido Westerwelle, 54, German politician, Minister for Foreign Affairs (2009–2013) and Vice-Chancellor (2009–2011), leukemia.
Harold Zisla, 90, American painter.

19
Bob Adelman, 85, American photographer of the Civil Rights Movement.
Roger Agnelli, 56, Brazilian bank and mining executive, CEO of Vale S.A. (2001–2011), plane crash.
Rashiduddin Ahmad, 78, Bangladeshi neurosurgeon.
José Artetxe, 85, Spanish footballer (Athletic Bilbao).
Zygmunt Bogdziewicz, 74, Polish Olympic sports shooter (1972, 1976). 
John Cannon, 35, Canadian rugby union player (national team), suspected heart attack.
Pavel Chernev, 46, Bulgarian politician, member of the National Assembly (2005–2009), pulmonary embolism.
Martha Ehlin, 38, Swedish organisation founder, cancer.
Adam Faul, 86, Canadian Olympic boxer (1948).
Graham Fortune, 74, New Zealand diplomat and public servant, permanent representative to the UN in Geneva (1987–1990), High Commissioner to Australia (1994–1999).
David Green, 76, Welsh cricketer (Lancashire, Gloucestershire).
José Ramón Herrero Merediz, 85, Spanish politician, member of the Senate (1982–1996) and European Parliament (1986–1987).
Jack Mansell, 88, British football player and coach.
Jerry Taylor, 78, American politician, member of the Arkansas House of Representatives (2001–2005) and Senate (2005–2012), Mayor of Pine Bluff (1992–2000), PSP.
Wong Lam, 96, Hong Kong politician, unofficial member of the Legislative Council of Hong Kong (1976–1985).
Zeinab Elobeid Yousif, 63–64, Sudanese aircraft engineer.

20
Jack Boxley, 84, English footballer (Bristol City, Coventry City).
Sándor Csjef, 65, Hungarian boxer, European champion (1973), hit by train.
Parveen Sultana Diti, 50, Bangladeshi actress, cancer.
Don Filleul, 90, Jersey politician, member of the States for Saint Helier No 1 (1978–1987), chairman of Jersey Heritage.
Robert J. Healey, 58, American politician, political activist and attorney, suspected heart attack.
Gayle Hopkins, 74, American Olympic long jumper (1964).
Anker Jørgensen, 93, Danish politician, Prime Minister (1972–1973, 1975–1982).
Zafar Mahmud, 92, Indian-Pakistani air force pilot.
Jacob Otanka Obetsebi-Lamptey, 70, Ghanaian politician, member of the Kufuor government (2001–2007), leukemia.
Odo Fusi Pecci, 95, Italian Roman Catholic prelate, Bishop of Senigallia (1971–1997).
Paddy Philpott, 79, Irish hurler (Cork).
Cedric Ritchie, 88, Canadian banker, CEO of Scotiabank. 
Stanley South, 88, American archaeologist.
Sveinung Valle, 57, Norwegian politician.

21
Robert McNeill Alexander, 81, British zoologist.
Film News Anandan, 88, Indian film historian. 
Leroy Blunt, 94, American politician, member of the Missouri House of Representatives (1979–1986), complications from stroke.
Peter Brown, 80, American actor (Lawman, Laredo, Foxy Brown), complications from Parkinson's disease.
Ian Bruce, 82, Canadian Olympic sailor.
Leon Charney, 77, American real estate tycoon and talk show host.
Alphonse Liguori Chaupa, 56, Papua New Guinean Catholic prelate, Bishop of Kimbe (2003–2008).
Jean Cornelis, 74, Belgian footballer (R.S.C. Anderlecht), complications following a heart attack.
Tomás de Mattos, 68, Uruguayan author, stroke.
Andrew Grove, 79, Hungarian-born American electronic executive, CEO and chairman of Intel Corporation, Parkinson's disease.
Ricardo Larraín, 58, Chilean film director (The Frontier), lymphoma.
Joseph Mercieca, 87, Maltese Roman Catholic prelate, Archbishop of Malta (1976–2006).
Paolo Maria Napolitano, 71, Italian judge, member of the Constitutional Court (2006–2015). 
Carolyn Squires, 75, American politician, member of the Montana Senate (2002–2010) and House of Representatives (2010–2014).

22
André Adam, 79, Belgian-French diplomat, Ambassador to Algeria (1986–1990), Zaire (1990–1991) and United States (1994–1998), injuries sustained in Brussels Airport bombings.
Ibrahim El Bakraoui, 29, Belgian terrorist (2016 Brussels bombings).
Khalid El Bakraoui, 27, Belgian terrorist (2016 Brussels bombings).
Enrico Bisso, 60, Italian Olympic swimmer.
Richard Bradford, 81, American actor (Man in a Suitcase, The Untouchables, Cagney & Lacey).
André Brincourt, 95, French author.
Petra Davies, 85, British actress. 
Glen Dawson, 103, American rock climber and mountaineer.
Javier de Nicoló, 87, Italian-born Colombian priest. 
Santiago J. Erevia, 69, American soldier, Medal of Honor recipient. 
Rob Ford, 46, Canadian politician, Mayor of Toronto (2010–2014), liposarcoma.
Rita Gam, 88, American actress (The Thief, Klute, No Exit) and filmmaker, respiratory failure.
Cecil Hechanova, 84, Filipino sports administrator (Philippine Sports Commission).
Aarne Honkavaara, 91, Finnish Olympic ice hockey player (1952) and coach (national team).
Magsud Ibrahimbeyov, 80, Azerbaijani writer and politician, member of the National Assembly.
Norm Johnson, 83, Canadian ice hockey player (Boston Bruins, Chicago Blackhawks).
Najim Laachraoui, 24, Moroccan-born Belgian terrorist (2016 Brussels bombings).
Justin Leiber, 77, American philosopher and science fiction writer.
Harold J. Morowitz, 88, American biophysicist.
Konstantin Ozgan, 76, Georgian Abkhaz politician.
Phife Dawg, 45, American rap musician (A Tribe Called Quest), complications from diabetes. 
James M. Robinson, 91, American biblical scholar.
David Smyrl, 80, American actor (Sesame Street, The Preacher's Wife, The Cosby Show), lung cancer.
Song Wencong, 85, Chinese aircraft designer (Chengdu J-10) and academic (Chinese Academy of Engineering).
Joseph Toppo, 72, Indian politician, MP for Tezpur (2009–2014), Assam MLA for Sonitpur (1996–2009), complications from a stroke.
Adam Kelly Ward, 33, American criminal, execution by lethal injection.

23
 David Blackburn, 76, British artist.
Gloria Galeano Garcés, 57, Colombian plant systematist.
Joe Garagiola Sr., 90, American baseball player (Cardinals, Cubs, Pirates) and Hall of Fame sportscaster (MLB GOTW), World Series champion (1946).
Sir Richard George, 71, British food manufacturer (Weetabix Limited).
Gegham Grigoryan, 65, Armenian opera singer.
Ruth Inge Hardison, 102, American sculptor, artist and photographer.
Jim Hillyer, 41, Canadian politician, MP for Medicine Hat—Cardston—Warner (since 2011), apparent heart attack.
Ken Howard, 71, American actor (1776, The White Shadow, J. Edgar), President of SAG/SAG-AFTRA (2009–2016), Emmy winner (1981, 2009).
James Jamerson, Jr., 58, American bass player (Chanson).
Lauri Lehtinen, 88, Finnish footballer.
John McKibbin, 69, American politician, member of the Washington House of Representatives (1974–1978), plane crash.
Aharon Megged, 95, Polish-born Israeli author.
Sir Peter Moores, 83, British businessman, Littlewoods chairman (1977–1980).
Rangy Nanan, 62, Trinidadian cricketer (West Indies, national team), heart attack.
J. Russell Nelson, 86, American educator, President of Arizona State University (1981–1989), complications from Alzheimer's disease.
Emanuele Nicosia, 63, Italian automobile designer.
Jimmy Riley, 68, Jamaican reggae musician, cancer.
Jim Roselle, 89, American radio broadcaster (WJTN).
Arie Smit, 99, Dutch-born Indonesian painter.
Fernando Solana, 85, Mexican diplomat and politician, member of the Senate for Mexico City (1994–2000), Secretary of Foreign Affairs (1988–1993), negotiated NAFTA.
Tom Whedon, 83, American television writer (The Golden Girls, The Electric Company, Alice).

24
Julius Adams, 67, American football player (New England Patriots).
Maggie Blye, 73, American actress (The Italian Job), cancer.
Roger Cicero, 45, German jazz and pop musician, stroke.
Johan Cruyff, 68, Dutch football player and manager (AFC Ajax, FC Barcelona, Feyenoord, national team), lung cancer.
Earl Hamner Jr., 92, American television writer and producer (Falcon Crest, The Waltons, The Twilight Zone), cancer.
Esther Herlitz, 94, Israeli diplomat and politician, Ambassador to Denmark (1966–1971), country's first female ambassador.
Marie-Claire Kirkland, 91, Canadian politician and judge, first woman elected to the Legislative Assembly of Quebec.
Tibor Machan, 77, Hungarian-American philosopher.
Mae-Wan Ho, 74, Hong Kong geneticist.
Timothée Modibo-Nzockena, 66, Congolese-born Gabonese Roman Catholic prelate, Bishop of Franceville (since 1996).
Edgar G. "Sonny" Mouton Jr., 86, American politician.
Leonard L. Northrup Jr., 98, American engineer.
V. D. Rajappan, 70, Indian actor.
Proloy Saha, 47, Indian footballer (East Bengal, national team), traffic collision.
Nicholas Scoppetta, 84, American civil servant, New York City Fire Commissioner (2002–2009).
Garry Shandling, 66, American comedian, actor and writer (The Larry Sanders Show, It's Garry Shandling's Show, Over the Hedge), Emmy winner (1998), pulmonary thrombosis.
Brendan Sloan, 67, Northern Irish Gaelic football player (Down). 
Tạ Chí Đại Trường, 77, Vietnamese historian.
Kevin Turner, 46, American football player (New England Patriots, Philadelphia Eagles), amyotrophic lateral sclerosis.

25
Abu Ali al-Anbari, 57–59, Iraqi militant, commander of ISIL, bombing.
Ken Barr, 83, Scottish artist.
Edmund Battersby, 66, American pianist.
Shannon Bolin, 99, American actress and singer.
Terry Brain, 60, British animator (The Trap Door), cancer.
Lalmuni Chaubey, 73, Indian politician, MP (1996–2009).
Angela Goodwin, 90, Italian actress (My Friends, Julia and Julia, Come Have Coffee with Us).
Kazuko Hirabayashi, 82, Japanese choreographer.
Tofig Ismayilov, 76, Azerbaijani film director, screenwriter and film scholar.
Ross Jennings, 71, New Zealand television producer (Police Ten 7, Melody Rules), cancer.
John Morphett, 83, Australian architect. 
Paolo Poli, 86, Italian theater actor.
David H. Porter, 80, American academic.
Imre Pozsgay, 82, Hungarian politician, MP (1983–1994).
Josef Anton Riedl, 86, German composer.
Clodomir Santos de Morais, 87, Brazilian sociologist. 
Ellen Seligman, American-born Canadian publisher. 
David Snellgrove, 95, British Tibetologist.
Lester Thurow, 77, American political economist.
Adam Żurowski, 86, Polish geodesist.

26
Ameli, Duchess of Oldenburg, 93, German royalty.
Lucas Gomes Arcanjo, 44, Brazilian police officer and political activist.
David Baker, 84, American jazz musician.
Raúl Cárdenas, 86, Mexican football player (Zacatepec) and coach (Cruz Azul, national team).
Michel Duc-Goninaz, 82, French Esperantist.
Jennifer Frey, 47, American sportswriter, multiple organ failure.
Francisco García Moreno, 68, Mexican Olympic water polo player (1968, 1972, 1976), 1975 Pan American Games champion, shot.
Norm Hadley, 51, Canadian rugby union player (London Wasps), suicide by drug overdose.
Jim Harrison, 78, American author and screenwriter (Legends of the Fall, Wolf).
Yoshimi Katayama, 75, Japanese racing driver.
János Kilián, 93, Hungarian Olympic speed skater.
Marinko Madžgalj, 37, Serbian actor, singer and television presenter, pancreatic cancer.
Radu Mareș, 75, Romanian prose writer and journalist.
Michael MccGwire, 91, British Royal Navy officer and international relations specialist.
Raymond Menmuir, 85, Australian television director.
Bernard Neal, 93, British structural engineer and croquet player.
Paddy O'Brien, 91, Irish Gaelic football player (Meath).
Igor Pashkevich, 44, Soviet-born Russian Olympic figure skater (1994, 1998), 1990 World Juniors champion.
John Rogers, 85, Australian Olympic cyclist.
Alfredo Sabbadin, 80, Italian cyclist.
Joe Shepley, 85, American jazz trumpeter.
Andreas Peter Cornelius Sol, 100, Dutch-born Indonesian Roman Catholic prelate, Bishop of Amboina (1965–1994).
Donald Stoltenberg, 88, American painter.

27
Aduke Alakija, 95, Nigerian diplomat, ambassador to Sweden (1984–1987). 
Mother Angelica, 92, American Poor Clare nun, founder of the Eternal Word Television Network.
Vince Boryla, 89, American basketball player and coach (New York Knicks), and general manager (Denver Nuggets), Olympic champion (1948). 
Judy-Joy Davies, 87, Australian swimmer and journalist, Olympic bronze medallist (1948).
Alain Decaux, 90, French historian, member of the Académie française.
Antoine Demoitié, 25, Belgian cyclist, race collision.
Abel Dhaira, 28, Ugandan footballer (national team), abdominal cancer.
Eric Engberg, 74, American news correspondent.
Silvio Fogel, 66, Argentine footballer (Puebla), heart attack.
Toni Grant, 73, American radio host and psychologist.
Curtis Hertel, 63, American politician, member (1981–1998) and Speaker (1997–1998) of the Michigan House of Representatives.
Gilbert Horn Sr., 92, American Assiniboine soldier and code talker (Merrill's Marauders).
Victor Pernac, 94, French cyclist.
Vic Peters, 60, Canadian curler, 1992 Labatt Brier champion, cancer.
Anatoly Savin, 95, Soviet and Russian weapons designer, Hero of Socialist Labour.
Henk Schueler, 93, Dutch speed skater.
Frank Torley, 75, New Zealand television presenter and producer (Country Calendar, Top Town), cancer.

28
Gilson Alvaristo, 59, Brazilian professional and Olympic cyclist (1980, 1984).
Wally Crouter, 92, Canadian radio broadcaster (CFRB).
Bogdan Denitch, 86, American sociologist.
Peggy Fortnum, 96, English illustrator (Paddington Bear).
Yvette Francis-McBarnette, 89, Jamaican-born American pediatrician.
Nicholas Gargano, 81, British welterweight boxer, Olympic bronze medallist (1956).
Yves Gominon, 82, French Olympic basketball player.
Igor Khait, 52, American animation producer (The Lego Movie, Atlantis: The Lost Empire, Brother Bear), pancreatic cancer.
Manzoor Mirza, 85, Pakistani economist. 
Petru Mocanu, 85, Romanian mathematician.
Daan Myngheer, 22, Belgian professional cyclist, heart attack.
James Noble, 94, American actor (Benson, 10, Archie: To Riverdale and Back Again), complications from a stroke.
Edmund Piątkowski, 80, Polish Olympic discus thrower (1960, 1964, 1968).
W. Ward Reynoldson, 95, American judge, Chief Justice of the Iowa Supreme Court (1978–1987).
Josef Simon, 85, German philosopher.
Mostafa Kamal Tolba, 93, Egyptian scientist, executive director of UNEP (1975–1992), President of Egyptian Olympic Committee (1971–1972).
Arthur W. Walker, 63, South African Air Force helicopter pilot.

29
*Baxter LePage, 11, American dog, first dog of Maine (since 2011).
Grahame Bowen, 69, Australian rugby league player (St. George Dragons, Cronulla-Sutherland Sharks).
Maxime Camara, 73, Guinean Olympic footballer (1968).
Raymond F. Clevenger, 89, American politician, Member of the United States House of Representatives from Michigan's 11th congressional district (1965-1967). 
Jean-Pierre Coffe, 78, French television presenter and food critic.
Yelena Donskaya, 100, Russian Soviet sports shooter, world champion (1958, 1962).
Patty Duke, 69, American actress (The Miracle Worker, The Patty Duke Show, Valley of the Dolls), President of SAG (1985–1988), Oscar winner (1962), sepsis.
Frank De Felitta, 94, American author and screenwriter (Audrey Rose).
Donald Harris, 84, American composer.
Heikki Hakola, 86, Finnish Olympic wrestler (1960).
Nil Hilevich, 84, Belarusian poet, cancer.
Francis Kane, 93, Canadian ice hockey player (Detroit Red Wings).
Jaya Krishna, 67, Indian film producer (Mana Voori Pandavulu). 
Jean Lapierre, 59, Canadian politician, Minister of Transport (2004–2006) and broadcaster (CKAC), plane crash.
Diana Mason, 82, British Olympic equestrian.
Nana Mchedlidze, 90, Georgian actress and film director.
Oscar Páez Garcete, 78, Paraguayan Roman Catholic prelate, Bishop of San Pedro (1978–1993) and Alto Paraná (1993–2000).
Steven Sample, 75, American educator, President of the University at Buffalo (1982–1991) and the University of Southern California (1991–2010).
Gabriel Singson, 87, Filipino banker, Governor of the Bangko Sentral (1993–1999).
John Wittenborn, 80, American football player (San Francisco 49ers, Philadelphia Eagles), NFL champion (1960).

30
Anne Aasheim, 53, Norwegian newspaper editor (Dagbladet), lung cancer.
Francisco Algora, 67, Spanish actor.
Jacques Bihozagara, 71, Rwandan politician and diplomat.
Vladimir Braginsky, 84, Russian physicist.
Howard Cable, 95, Canadian conductor, composer and arranger.
Denys Carnill, 90, British field hockey player, Olympic bronze medallist (1952).
Gordon Guyer, 89, American educator, President of Michigan State University (1992–1993).
Shirley Hufstedler, 90, American lawyer and judge, Secretary of Education (1979–1981).  
Mohammad Ferdous Khan, 96, Bangladeshi educationist and politician.
John King, 77, English football player and manager (Tranmere).
Marianne Krencsey, 84, Hungarian actress.
Bernard Lamarre, 84, Canadian soil mechanics engineer and businessman, CEO of Lavalin (1962–1991).
Seymour Lazar, 88, American lawyer.
Frankie Michaels, 60, American actor and singer, Tony winner (1966).
Bajina Ramprasad, 75, Indian cricketer.
Donald Rickard, 88, American diplomat. 
J. Thomas Rosch, 76, American lawyer, Commissioner of Federal Trade Commission (2006–2013), complications of Parkinson's disease.
Bill Rosendahl, 70, American politician, member of the Los Angeles City Council (2005–2013), cancer.
Ralph Seitsinger, 100, American politician and businessman, Mayor of El Paso, Texas (1961–1963).
Ilmari Susiluoto, 68, Finnish political scientist.
Gianmaria Testa, 57, Italian singer-songwriter.
Paul Thyness, 85, Norwegian politician.

31
Orlando Álvarez, 64, Puerto Rican baseball player (Los Angeles Dodgers, California Angels), complications from diabetes.
Aníbal Alzate, 83, Colombian footballer.
Warren E. Barry, 82, American politician.
Werner Baer, 85, American economist.
Béla Biszku, 94, Hungarian politician, Minister of the Interior (1957–1961).
Ian Britton, 61, Scottish football player (Chelsea, Blackpool, Burnley) and manager (Nelson), cancer.
Tom Butters, 77, American college sports administrator (Duke Blue Devils) and baseball player (Pittsburgh Pirates).
Giorgio Calabrese, 86, Italian songwriter.
Ronnie Corbett, 85, British comedian and actor (The Two Ronnies, The Frost Report, Casino Royale), motor neurone disease.
Georges Cottier, 93, Swiss Roman Catholic cardinal.
Amaury Epaminondas, 80, Brazilian footballer (São Paulo F.C., Deportivo Toluca F.C.).
Sir Robert Finch, 71, British businessman, Lord Mayor of London (2003).
Edgar Fredricks, 73, American politician.
Hans-Dietrich Genscher, 89, German politician, Minister of the Interior (1969–1974) and Foreign Affairs (1974–1982; 1982–1992), Vice Chancellor (1974–1982; 1982–1992), heart failure.
Dame Zaha Hadid, 65, Iraqi-born British architect, heart attack.
Imre Kertész, 86, Hungarian writer, laureate of the Nobel Prize in Literature (2002), complications from Parkinson's disease.
Leonard Mayaen, 63, Filipino politician, Governor of Mountain Province (1998–2001, since 2010), cardiac arrest.
Fernando Mendes, 78, Portuguese football player and manager (Sporting CP).
Ken Moore, 90, Canadian football player.
André Paris, 90, French Olympic athlete.
Eugene Parker, 60, American sports agent.
Terry Plumeri, 71, American musician, conductor and composer, homicide. 
Khuzaima Qutbuddin, 75, Indian Islamic leader.
Denise Robertson, 83, British writer and television broadcaster (This Morning), pancreatic cancer.
Bill Robinson, 87, American football player (Green Bay Packers).
Bertil Roos, 72, Swedish racing driver and instructor. 
Robert M. Sayre, 91, American diplomat.
Jimmy Toner, 92, Scottish footballer (Dundee, Leeds United).
Kris Travis, 32, English wrestler, cancer.
Gheorghe Vrabie, 77, Moldovan artist, designer of the coat of arms, seal of Chișinău and the leu.
Ward Wettlaufer, 80, American golfer. 
Douglas Wilmer, 96, English actor (Sherlock Holmes, Octopussy, Jason and the Argonauts).

References

2016-03
 03